Vaughn Elementary School may refer to:
 Jimmy and Sammy Lane Vaughn Elementary School (Frisco, Texas) of Frisco Independent School District
 Vaughn Elementary School (Vaughn, New Mexico) of Vaughn Municipal Schools

See also
 Max O. Vaughan Elementary School (Allen, Texas) of Allen Independent School District